The Philippine Dental Association (PDA) is an association of professional dentists in the Philippines. It dates back to 1908 with the establishment of Sociedad dental de Filipinas. After World War II, on August 12, 1945, this organization merged with the National Dental Association (founded in 1924) to form the Philippine Dental Organization.It was inaugurated on September 7, 1945. The first issue of its official publication, the Journal of the Philippine Dental Association was published in January 1948.

The PDA offers and encourages the development and further education of dental professionals as well as provide legal assistance. Its headquarters is located at the Philippine Dental Association Building, Ayala Ave. Makati.

Marker from the National Historical Institute 

The historical marker entitled Philippine Dental Association was installed in 2008 at the PDA Building. It was installed by the National Historical Institute (NHI).

See also 
Dentistry in the Philippines.

References

External links 
Official website

  

Dental organizations